This is a list of universities in Cape Verde:

 Instituto Superior de Ciências Económicas e Empresariais
 Instituto Superior de Ciências Jurídicas e Sociais
 Jean Piaget University of Cape Verde
 M EIA - Instituto Universitário de Arte, Tecnologia e Cultura
 University of Mindelo
 Universidade de Santiago
 Universidade Lusófona de Cabo Verde
 University of Cape Verde
 Universidade Intercontinental de Cabo Verde

References

 
Universities
Cape Verde
Cape Verde